The following is list of episodes for the Showtime original series Tracey Ullman's State of the Union, starring Tracey Ullman.

Series overview

Season 1 (2008)

Season 2 (2009)

Season 3 (2010)

External links
Tracey Ullman's State of the Union on TV.com

Tracey Ullman's State of the Union
Tracey Ullman